= Kampung Bukit Kalam =

Village in Labuan Malaysia

Coordinates: 5°18′25.2″N 115°11′46.2″E

Kampung Bukit Kalam is a village in Federal Territory of Labuan, Malaysia.
